Bay Path University is a private university in Longmeadow, Massachusetts. Bay Path offers both all-women bachelor's degree programs (both on-campus and online), co-educational master's degree programs (both on-campus and online), an occupational therapy doctorate program, and an EdD in Higher Education Leadership & Organizational Studies program for men and women. The university also has The American Women's College on-ground and online offering bachelor's degree programs to adult women.

Founded in 1897 as the Bay Path Institute, the college has gone through several name changes. From 1988 to 2014 it was known as Bay Path College. Bay Path University is a member of the Cooperating Colleges of Greater Springfield, an eight-college consortium.

History 
Bay Path was founded in 1897 as Bay Path Institute in Springfield, Massachusetts. Bay Path started as an urban, coeducational institute offering business teacher training, secretarial science, business administration and accounting degrees. The name Bay Path was derived from its location on the old Bay Path (a part of Boston Post Road), which united the western part of the state with what was once the Massachusetts Bay Colony. The first class in 1897 was 30 students, but Bay Path grew rapidly in its first few decades. In 1920, Bay Path bought the Clawson-Hamilton Business School of Brattleboro, Vermont, and renamed it the Brattleboro Business Institute. In the same year the competitor Griffin Business School was also purchased and integrated into Bay Path.  Bay Path was one of the largest and most successful business schools in the highly competitive Northeast during this time, with a peak enrollment of 1,200 students taking classes in innovative, accelerated format. The institution struggled heavily, however, during the Great Depression and World War II, and by 1944 the institute was nearly bankrupt.

In 1945, the college moved to Longmeadow, Massachusetts, was renamed Bay Path Secretarial School, and developed a new mission and vision to become a women's only college. Four years later, the institution became Bay Path Junior College. In order to further expand its offerings, in 1988 Bay Path became a four-year degree-granting institution, and its name was changed to Bay Path College.

In 1999, Bay Path established an accelerated program for women to earn their bachelor's degree through a Saturday only program. In 2000, Bay Path began offering Master of Science degrees. After 14 years of offering master's degree programs, reaching 20 master's degree offerings in 2014, Bay Path changed its name to Bay Path University to reflect its status as both a bachelors' and masters' granting institution.

Academics 
Bay Path University offers bachelor's, master's degrees,  the Occupational Therapy doctorate, and the EdD. Degree programs are balanced between those with an arts and science focus and those with professional focus. The university features majors that are heavily focused on practical, hands-on application of course work, and students take the majority of their credits within their major. The university has 30 major programs for bachelor's degrees and 30+ degree and certification programs at the graduate level. Bay Path has a student to faculty ratio of 12:1 in its undergraduate programs, and its freshmen retention rate is 74.3%.

While the master's degree programs are co-educational, the bachelor's degree programs are women-focused. Bay Path's focus on women is demonstrated through its WELL (Women as Empowered Learners and Leaders) program with all undergraduate students required to take three qualifying courses in their first, third, and fourth year (with an optional class in their second year). These courses focus on developing skills in learning (research, writing, speaking, analysis, and technology) and leading (identify strengths, setting of personal, academic and professional goals) while researching local and global issues that affect women.

Bay Path University is accredited by the New England Commission of Higher Education.

Campuses

Longmeadow Campus 
The primary campus for Bay Path University is in the suburban town of Longmeadow, Massachusetts, located in Pioneer Valley along the Connecticut River in New England. The  campus is adjacent to the Longmeadow Historic District, notable for having over 100 homes built before the 1900s, and the college owns a number of historic homes in town. The heart of the Longmeadow campus started with the 1945 purchase of the Wallace estate. The 18-acre estate had three buildings in 1945: a Georgian American colonial mansion (now Leary Hall), a large garage with turntable for parking cars (Glen Hall), and a cottage (Annex). After decades of growth and expansion, the campus now holds 14 academic and administrative buildings and six homes principally used for faculty offices.

Graduate Center for Health Sciences 
The Philip H. Ryan Health Science Center is located in East Longmeadow, Massachusetts and houses our graduate programs in Education, Healthcare and Psychology .

Concord Campus 
The Concord location is home to graduate degrees and certificates in Education and Psychology. The Concord campus is located at 521 Virginia Road, Concord, MA 01742.

Student life
Bay Path has 27 clubs and organizations for students over a wide range of interests.

Athletics 
Bay Path University teams are known as the Wildcats. The college is a member of the United States Collegiate Athletic Association (USCAA) and competes at the Division I (USCAA)|Division I level in the USCAA since the 2021–22 academic year. Bay Path fields volleyball, softball and soccer as varsity sports.

Bay Path competed as a member of the National Collegiate Athletic Association (NCAA) at the Division III level, primarily as a member of the New England Collegiate Conference (NECC) from 2008–09 to 2020–21; and before that a charter member of the North Atlantic Conference (NAC) from 1996–97 to 2007–08.

Women's Leadership Conference 
Bay Path holds an annual Women's Leadership Conference in Springfield, MA. Over 800 people attended the inaugural event in 1996, with the keynote speaker Elizabeth Dole, former US Labor and Transportation Secretary. Since then, the Conference has featured speakers like PBS/ABC news correspondent Cokie Roberts (1997), NBC news chief and foreign affairs correspondent Andrea Mitchell (2002), former U.S. Secretary of State Madeleine Albright (2005), writer Maya Angelou (2007), actress Jane Fonda (2008), and journalist Barbara Walters (2014). Prior to the establishment of the annual conference, Bay Path held events which included former British Prime Minister Margaret Thatcher speaking to Bay Path students in 1988 at Springfield Symphony Hall.

Ranking 
In 2013, Forbes magazine ranked the financial viability of 925 private, not for profit colleges in the United States. In this assessment, Forbes assigned a letter grade based on the financial health of the institution, and found that more than half of private institutions scored at a C grade or below. Bay Path received a ranking of 264 out of 925, earning a "B" grade for the financial health of the institution.

In 2014, The Chronicle of Higher Education compiled a list of the fastest growing colleges in America over a ten-year period from 2002 to 2012. During that time, in the category of private, baccalaureate institutions, Bay Path's growth was the eighth highest in the nation, ranking higher than any other college in the knowledge corridor. Over the ten-year period surveyed, Bay Path grew from a 2002 enrollment of 1,107 students to a 2012 enrollment of 2,370 students: a 114% increase.

In 2015, Dr. Carol A. Leary and Bay Path were ranked #25 in The Boston Globe and The Commonwealth Institute annual Top 100 Women-Led Businesses in Massachusetts.

References

External links 
 

 
Private universities and colleges in Massachusetts
Women's universities and colleges in the United States
Educational institutions established in 1897
Universities and colleges in Hampden County, Massachusetts
Liberal arts colleges in Massachusetts
1897 establishments in Massachusetts